Franciscus Cornelis Marie (Frans) Wijffels (10 April 1899, Stratum – 22 March 1968, Delft) was a Dutch politician of the Roman Catholic State Party (RKSP) and its successor the Catholic People's Party (KVP).

Wijffels was Minister of Social Affairs in the third Gerbrandy cabinet and also a member of the House of Representatives and the Senate.

References 
  Parlement.com biography
  Biography by the Institute of Dutch History

1899 births
1966 deaths
Catholic People's Party politicians
20th-century Dutch politicians
Delft University of Technology alumni
Dutch people of World War II
Dutch Roman Catholics
Members of the House of Representatives (Netherlands)
Members of the Senate (Netherlands)
Ministers of Social Affairs of the Netherlands
Ministers of Transport and Water Management of the Netherlands
People from Eindhoven
Roman Catholic State Party politicians